Jennifer Ruth Howard (born 12 July 1965) is an Australian politician. She has been the Labor member for Ipswich in the Queensland Legislative Assembly since 2015.
Jennifer has been active in community groups such as Zonta International, school P&Cs, sporting club committees, and other community groups.

In 2005, Jennifer played a pivotal role in the establishment of the Ipswich Women's Development Network, a not-for-profit organisation that helps empower women in Ipswich.

Political career

2015 State Election 
Howard defeated Ian Berry at the 2015 Queensland state election by a margin of 65.9% to 34.1%, achieving a two party preferred swing of 20.09%.

2017 State Election 
The main contenders for the seat of Ipswich at the 2017 Queensland state election were Howard (as the incumbent) and the recently dismissed One Nation Senator Malcolm Roberts. The results on polling day were clear as the former Senator was comfortably defeated by Howard, with a margin of 60.89% to 39.11%.

2020 State Election 
This election saw Howard's primary vote increase to 51.8% (3.82% swing) bringing her total vote to 66.5% beating her LNP opponent Scott O'Connell at 33.5%. This was a part of a trend seen across all of Queensland in the 2020 election supporting Annastacia Palaszczuk leadership during the COVID pandemic.

Parliamentary Positions 
Howard currently serves as the Assistant Minister for Veterans' Affairs and Assistant Minister of State, having been appointed following the 2017 State Election. She has previously served as the Assistant Minister of State Assisting the Premier from 11 November 2016 to 11 December 2017, Assistant Minister for Local Government from 8 December 2015 to 11 November 2016. She also served as Chair of the Agriculture and Environment Committee from 27 March 2015 to 18 February 2016. She became Chair of the Ethics Committee after the 2020 election.

References

1965 births
Living people
Members of the Queensland Legislative Assembly
Australian Labor Party members of the Parliament of Queensland
21st-century Australian politicians
Women members of the Queensland Legislative Assembly
21st-century Australian women politicians